Thomas Harold Netherton Jr. (January 11, 1947 – January 7, 2018), was an American singer. He was known for his tenure on The Lawrence Welk Show.

Early life
Netherton was born on January 11, 1947, in Munich, Germany while his father, a United States Army officer, was stationed there. The eldest of four children, Netherton and his family relocated frequently due to his father's Army career.  The Nethertons permanently settled in Bloomington, Minnesota in 1961.

After enlisting in the Army during the Vietnam War, Netherton was stationed in Panama, serving as a 2nd Lieutenant. He had also decided to pursue a singing career and sang with Army and Air Force music ensembles.  Netherton became a born again Christian following a sermon he heard at a Baptist church in Panama, spending a year at the Bethany Fellowship Missionary Training Center in Bloomington after his discharge from the Army.  Faced with making a choice between missionary service and a career in entertainment, Netherton chose to follow the same path taken by his idol, Pat Boone, and became a Christian singer.

Career
Netherton joined the Lawrence Welk show cast in 1973.  His inclusion with Welk's group of entertainers came as a result of a recommendation to Welk by Harold and Sheila Schafer, owners of a North Dakota theater where Netherton had been performing. Netherton appeared regularly on the Lawrence Welk show from 1973 to 1982.  In 1975 he appeared on "The Dating Game", choosing from three bachelorettes. In 1979, he wrote an autobiography titled "In The Morning of My Life".

Apart from his long-time attachment to the Welk program, Netherton recorded both Christian and secular music albums while still on the program and after.  His career post-Lawrence Welk included touring and performing around the United States as well as acting in stage musical productions of Oklahoma! and Carousel.  During the 1970s and 1980s he appeared on television commercials for Rose Milk skin care lotion and Nabisco's Triscuits crackers.  Netherton was a guest on television shows such as Pat Robertson's The 700 Club, Robert Schuller's The Hour of Power and would appear at Billy Graham religious crusades.

Personal life
As of late 2007, Netherton had been living in Goshen, Indiana where he performed for holiday programs and entertaining local senior citizens at Greencroft Senior Center.
Netherton never married.
On January 11, 2018, Netherton's younger brother, Brad Netherton, announced on his Facebook page that the singer had died from pneumonia and the flu on January 7, 2018, at age 70. An obituary appeared on the Nashville Funeral and Cremation web site.

Discography
1975: My Favorite Hymns
1975: What a Friend We Have in Jesus
1977: Love Songs
1978: Hem of His Garment
1979: The Lord's Prayer
1981: Reflection
1984: Scrap Book
1985: Songs of the Savior
1987: The Tom Netherton Christmas Album
1992: How Great Thou Art
1994: 22 Great Songs Of Faith
1995: Gospel Favorites
1996: Just As I Am

Books

1979: In the Morning of My Life, autobiography, Tyndale House, 1979.

References

External links
Lawrence Welk Show Website

Video biography from Welk Stars through the Years, 2009
East Coast Entertainment

1947 births
2018 deaths
American performers of Christian music
American male singers
German emigrants to the United States
People from Bloomington, Minnesota
United States Army soldiers
Lawrence Welk
Deaths from pneumonia in Indiana